Auldgirth Bridge is a bridge over the River Nith just outside Auldgirth in Dumfries and Galloway, Scotland. Designed by David Henderson of Edinburgh in 1781, it was built by William Stewart, and completed in 1782; Thomas Carlyle's father worked on its construction. The bridge is made of red sandstone ashlar, with three segmental arched spans, and carried road traffic and pedestrians; refuges are built into the parapets, supported by pilasters on the piers, allowing pedestrians using the bridge to move out of the path of heavier traffic.

The bridge was built to carry the main road from Auldgirth (which became the A76) south over the river. It was designated a Category A listed building in 1971. In 1979, a new road bridge was completed a short distance away and the course of the road was altered, bypassing Auldgirth Bridge. It remains in use as a footbridge.

References

Sources

Category A listed buildings in Dumfries and Galloway
18th-century establishments in Scotland
Bridges completed in 1782
Road bridges in Scotland